Jackie Kiddle (born 16 July 1994) is a New Zealand rower.

Kiddle received her education at Wellington Girls' College, and she took up rowing in 2008 in her final year. She represented New Zealand at the 2013 Australian Youth Olympic Festival. Kiddle's first appearance at a FISA event was at the 2014 World Rowing U23 Championships in Varese, Italy, where she came fourth in the lightweight single sculls. At the 2015 World Rowing U23 Championships in Plovdiv, Bulgaria, she won gold in the lightweight double sculls with Zoe McBride, setting a new world best time. At the 2016 World Rowing U23 Championships at the Willem-Alexander Baan in Rotterdam, Netherlands, she won a silver medal lightweight double sculls with Lucy Jonas. At the 2017 World Rowing Championships in Sarasota, Florida, she won a silver medal in the lightweight double sculls partnered with Zoe McBride. At the 2018 World Rowing Championships in Plovdiv, Bulgaria, McBride and Kiddle came sixth in the lightweight double sculls.

Kiddle completed an MSc in animal behaviour at the University of Waikato in 2021.

References

External links

Living people
1994 births
New Zealand female rowers
World Rowing Championships medalists for New Zealand
People educated at Wellington Girls' College
Sportspeople from New Plymouth